Gregorio Giuseppe Gaetani de Aragonia (1643–1710) was a Roman Catholic prelate who served as Titular Patriarch of Alexandria (1695–1710), Apostolic Nuncio to Florence (1676–1678), and Titular Archbishop of Neocaesarea in Ponto (1676–1695).

Biography
Gregorio Giuseppe Gaetani de Aragonia was born in Piedimonte Matese, Italy in 1643.
On 24 February 1676, he was appointed during the papacy of Pope Clement X as Titular Archbishop of Neocaesarea in Ponto.
On 15 March 1676, he was consecrated bishop by Francesco Nerli (iuniore), Archbishop of Florence, with Antonio Pignatelli del Rastrello, Bishop of Lecce, and Stefano Brancaccio, Bishop of Viterbo e Tuscania, serving as co-consecrators. 
On 4 April 1676, he was appointed during the papacy of Pope Clement X as Apostolic Nuncio to Florence where he served until his resignation on 15 June 1678.
On 2 May 1695, he was appointed during the papacy of Pope Innocent XII as Titular Patriarch of Alexandria.
He served as Titular Patriarch of Alexandria until his death on 12 August 1710.

Episcopal succession
While bishop, he was the principal co-consecrator of:

References

External links and additional sources
 (for Chronology of Bishops)
 (for Chronology of Bishops)

17th-century Italian Roman Catholic titular archbishops
18th-century Italian Roman Catholic titular archbishops
Bishops appointed by Pope Clement X
Bishops appointed by Pope Innocent XII
People from Piedimonte Matese
1643 births
1710 deaths